Nalma  is a village development committee in Lamjung District in the Gandaki Zone of northern-central Nepal. At the time of the 1991 Nepal census it had a population of 2082 people living in 409 individual households. The villages of Nalma VDC are as follows:
 Jyarkhang
 Bakhrijagat
 Syare, Lausibot, Kochme
 Puran Gaun
 Gairi Gaun
 Danda Gaun
 Bartu
 Chodo khora
 Fedi
 Ramche Khola

'''Population by ward no. as per National Population Census 2011

References

External links
UN map of the municipalities of Lamjung District

Populated places in Lamjung District